John of Isenburg-Arnfels (German: Johann von Isenburg-Arnfels) was the co-Count of Isenburg-Arnfels from 1305 until 1319 with Count Theodoric.

1319 deaths
House of Isenburg
Year of birth unknown